Olkhonsky District is an administrative district, one of the thirty-three in Irkutsk Oblast, Russia. Municipally, it is incorporated as Olkhonsky Municipal District. Its administrative center is the rural locality (a selo) of Yelantsy. Population:  8,955 (2002 Census);  The population of Yelantsy accounts for 42.4% of the district's total population.

References

Notes

Sources

Districts of Irkutsk Oblast